Gnathonarium is a genus of  dwarf spiders that was first described by Ferdinand Anton Franz Karsch in 1881.

Species
 it contains seven species and one subspecies, found in Canada, China, Israel, Japan, Kazakhstan, Korea, Mongolia, the Philippines, Russia, Turkey, and the United States:
Gnathonarium biconcavum Tu & Li, 2004 – China
Gnathonarium dentatum (Wider, 1834) (type) – Europe, North Africa, Turkey, Caucasus, Russia (Europe to Far East), Kazakhstan, Central Asia, China, Korea, Japan
Gnathonarium d. orientale (O. Pickard-Cambridge, 1872) – Israel
Gnathonarium exsiccatum (Bösenberg & Strand, 1906) – Japan
Gnathonarium gibberum Oi, 1960 – Russia (South Siberia), China, Korea, Japan
Gnathonarium luzon Tanasevitch, 2017 – Philippines (Luzon)
Gnathonarium suppositum (Kulczyński, 1885) – Russia (Middle Siberia to Far East), USA (Alaska), Canada
Gnathonarium taczanowskii (O. Pickard-Cambridge, 1873) – Russia (Urals to Far East), Kazakhstan, Mongolia, China, USA (Alaska), Canada

See also
 List of Linyphiidae species (A–H)

References

Araneomorphae genera
Linyphiidae
Palearctic spiders
Spiders of Asia
Spiders of North America
Spiders of Russia